The UEFA Women's Nations League is an upcoming biennial international women's football competition contested by the senior women's national teams of the member associations of UEFA, the sport's European governing body.

The competition will feature three leagues, with promotion and relegation between them in addition to a final tournament to determine the champions. It will also act as part of the qualifying process for the UEFA Women's Championship, FIFA Women's World Cup and Women's Olympic Football Tournament, depending on the season.

History
On 2 November 2022, the UEFA Executive Committee approved a new women's national team competition system, which was publicly announced the following  day. This included the announcement of a women's Nations League competition beginning in 2023. The new system came as part of the UEFA women's football strategy for 2019 to 2024, and was approved after discussions between representatives of national associations and the recommendation of the UEFA Women's Football Committee. The Women's Nations League will act as the first phase of a two-part women's national team competition cycle, with the other phase being the European Qualifiers for the UEFA Women's Championship or FIFA Women's World Cup.

The new system is designed to create more competitive matches, with teams facing others of a similar strength, while generating a greater sporting and commercial interest in women's national team football. However, the system still gives all national teams a chance of qualifying for major international tournaments. The interconnected competition cycles are intended to encourage the long-term development of women's national teams.

Format
The competition will begin with the league stage, featuring the national teams split into three leagues (A, B and C). Leagues A and B will feature 16 teams in 4 groups of 4, while League C will consist of the remaining competition entrants split into groups of three or four. The teams in each group will play against each other home-and-away in a round-robin format. The four group winners of League A will advance to the Nations League Finals, organised by the participating teams, which will feature single-leg semi-finals, a third place play-off and final. In Summer Olympic years, the Nations League Finals will determine the teams which will qualify for the Women's Olympic Football Tournament.

In addition, the competition will feature promotion and relegation, taking effect in the next edition of qualification for the UEFA Women's Championship or FIFA Women's World Cup (both of which also will use an identical league structure). The group winners of Leagues B and C will be automatically promoted, while the fourth-placed teams in Leagues A and B, as well as the lowest-ranked third-placed team in League B (conditional upon the number of entrants), will be automatically relegated. Promotion/relegation matches will also be held on a home-and-away basis, taking place in parallel with the Nations League Finals, with the winners going into the higher league and the losers going into the lower league. The third-placed teams of League A will play the runners-up of League B, while the three best-ranked third-placed teams in League B will play the three best-ranked League C runners-up (conditional upon the number of entrants).

Link with European Qualifiers
The Women's Nations League will be linked with qualification for the UEFA Women's Championship and FIFA Women's World Cup. The qualifiers will use the same league stage system as the Women's Nations League, with teams split into Leagues A, B and C. Teams in qualification will be split into leagues based on the results of the prior edition of the Women's Nations League. The results of qualification league stage will determine which teams qualify automatically to the Women's Euro or World Cup, and which teams will enter the play-offs. In addition, teams will be automatically promoted and relegated using the same format as in the Women's Nations League, though no promotion/relegation matches will take place. This will determine the league composition for the next edition of the Women's Nations League.

References

Nations League
2022 establishments in Europe
Multi-national association football leagues in Europe
Recurring sporting events established in 2022
Women's association football leagues in Europe